USCGC Aurora (WPC-103) was a , steel-hulled, diesel-powered  of the United States Coast Guard.

History
She was laid down in January 1931 at the Bath, Maine shipyard of Bath Iron Works and launched on 28 November 1931 one of 18 Thetis-class patrol boats. She was commissioned on 21 December 1931. She was one of the early ships in the mid-1941 established Alaskan Sector (colloquially known as the "Alaskan Navy") of the 13th Naval District under Captain Ralph C. Parker. During the Japanese attack on the Aleutian Islands in June 1942, she served as part of Task Force 8 under Rear Admiral Robert A. Theobald, Commander of the North Pacific Force, tasked with defending Alaska from Japanese attack. She was part of Task Group 8.2 (the Surface Search Group) consisting of the patrol craft of Parker's fleet: his flagship, the gunboat; 5 cutters (Aurora, Cyane, and Bonham); 14 YP patrol vessels; and an old ocean tugboat. TG 8.2 was to establish a picket line to signal any Japanese approach.

Some time after the war, she was based at San Juan, Puerto Rico. She was involved in operations during the Cuban Missile Crisis (1962) and the Dominican Civil War (1965)  for which she was awarded the Armed Forces Expeditionary Medal. She was decommissioned on 17 January 1960 and sold on 16 December 1968. She finished her days as a merchant ship under the same name (registration SE1998).

References

1931 ships
Thetis-class patrol boats
Ships of the United States Coast Guard
World War II patrol vessels of the United States
Ships built in Bath, Maine
Ships built by Bath Iron Works
Ships of the Aleutian Islands campaign